For the Welsh politician and barrister, see Evan Price.

Evan John Price (May 8, 1840 – August 30, 1899) was a Canadian lumber merchant and politician.
Born at Wolfesfield (or Wolfe's Field) Estate in  Sillery, the fourth son of William Price, a lumber merchant and Jane Stewart, he was educated in the UK. He was a partner in the lumbering, manufacturing and exporting company of Price Brothers and a Vice-President of the Union Bank of Canada. Price was appointed to the Senate representing the senatorial division of The Laurentides, Quebec on the advice of John Alexander Macdonald on December 1, 1888. A Conservative, he served almost 11 years until his death in 1899.

References

External links

1840 births
1899 deaths
Canadian senators from Quebec
Conservative Party of Canada (1867–1942) senators
People from Sainte-Foy–Sillery–Cap-Rouge
Anglophone Quebec people
Canadian people of Welsh descent